Suphrodytes dorsalis is a species of beetle in the family Dytiscidae, the only species in the genus Suphrodytes.

References

Dytiscidae